Wenceslao Ayguals de Izco (Vinaròs, 1801 – Madrid, 1873) was a Spanish writer and editor.

Spanish male writers
Military personnel of the First Carlist War
1801 births
1873 deaths